A list of Japanese films that were released in 2014.

Highest-grossing films
The following is a list of the 10 highest-grossing Japanese films at the Japanese box office during 2014, according to the Motion Picture Producers Association of Japan.

Film releases

January – March

April – June

July – September

October – December

See also
 2014 in Japan
 2014 in Japanese television
 List of 2014 box office number-one films in Japan

References

External links

2014
Japanese
Film